Asom Gana Sangram Parishad (Assam Popular Struggle Association), a political party in the Indian state of Assam. AGSP was launched by the Asom Jatiyatabadi Yuva Chatra Parishad (AJYCP) in 1999. Party president is Jatindra Kumar Borgohain.

In the 2001 state legislative assembly polls in the state, AGSP joined the Rashtriya Democratic Alliance led by the Nationalist Congress Party.

Political parties in Assam
1999 establishments in Assam
Political parties established in 1999